The Sand River (French: Rivière Sand) is a river in the Unorganized North Part of Algoma District in Northeastern Ontario, Canada. It is in the Great Lakes Basin, is a tributary of Lake Superior, and its entire course lies within Lake Superior Provincial Park.

The river is named after the sand bar formed across its mouth. The Ojibway name for the river is Pinguisibi, where pingui means fine white sand and sibi means river.

Course
The Sand River begins at Sand Lake, in geographic Stoney Township, on which is located the railway point of Sand Lake on the Algoma Central Railway. It travels South into geographic Barnes Township, geographic Barager Township, and geographic Broome Township, the latter in which it heads over Calwin Falls. The river continues south into geographic Goodwillie Township, flows over Lady Evelyn Falls, and takes in the left tributary Kwagama Creek. It then heads southwest, descends a series of low cascades, passes under Ontario Highway 17 and reaches its mouth at Lake Superior.

Recreation
The entire river is a designated canoe route. There is a picnic area at the mouth of the river next to Highway 17 where many travelers stop to enjoy a view of the cascading falls, and the Pinguisibi hiking trail follows the right bank from the river mouth.

Tributaries
Kwagama Creek
Sand Lake
Sand Creek

See also

List of rivers of Ontario

References 

Rivers of Algoma District
Tributaries of Lake Superior